
Qullpa Qucha (Quechua qullpa salty, saltpeter, qucha lake,  hispanicized spellings Collpa Cocha, Collpacocha, Khollpa Khocha, Kollpa Q'ocha) is a Bolivian lake located in Vacas Municipality, Arani Province, Cochabamba Department.

See also 
 Phaqcha Mayu
 Parqu Qucha
 Asiru Qucha
 Pilawit'u

References

External links 
 Population data and map of Vacas Municipality

Lakes of Cochabamba Department